One of a Kind is the ninth extended play by the South Korean boy group Monsta X. It was released by Starship Entertainment and distributed by Kakao Entertainment on June 1, 2021.

Background and release 
The extended play was announced in May 2021. On May 3, Starship Entertainment announced that Shownu would not be promoting with the group for the comeback due to health issues.

The lead single "Gambler" was written in part by members Joohoney and I.M, and was the first lead single for the group produced by Joohoney. Additionally, Hyungwon wrote the fan dedicated song "Bebe" and wrote and produced for the song "Secrets", and I.M wrote and produced for the song "Rotate".

Critical reception

Ruby C, writing for NME, describes "Gambler" as a departure "from the group's usual (and predictable) title-as-a-repetitive-hook formula to create an alluring and unadulteratedly fun song". For the track "Secrets", she also wrote that, "it could have fit right in with [All About Luv'''s] pop sensibilities, sax outro, and mildly suggestive lyrics".

Listicles

Commercial performance
The EP peaked at number three on the weekly Gaon Album Chart and sold more than 300,000 copies in its first month of release in South Korea.

All the songs from the EP charted on the weekly Billboard'' World Digital Song Sales chart, occupying more than twenty-five percent of the entire World Songs chart.

Track listing

Charts

Album

Weekly charts

Monthly chart

Year-end chart

Songs

Weekly charts

Certification and sales

Awards and nominations

Release history

See also
 List of K-pop songs on the Billboard charts
 List of K-pop songs on the World Digital Song Sales chart

References

2021 EPs
Korean-language EPs
Monsta X EPs
Starship Entertainment EPs